The Battle of Posada (9–12 November 1330) was fought between Basarab I of Wallachia and Charles I of Hungary (also known as Charles Robert).

The small Wallachian army led by Basarab, formed of cavalry and foot archers, as well as local peasants, managed to ambush and defeat the 30,000-strong Hungarian army, in a mountainous region.

The battle resulted in a major Wallachian victory.

Background

Some historians claim that the Cumans aided the Wallachians in the battle. Still in the Hungarian army there was a substantial Cuman-Hungarian contingent so this variant is very improbable. In 1324, Wallachia was a vassal of Hungary, and Charles referred to Basarab as "our Transalpine Voivode".

The war started with encouragement from the Voivode of Transylvania and a certain Dionisie, who later bore the title Ban of Severin. In 1330, Charles captured the long disputed Wallachian citadel of Severin and handed it to the Transylvanian Voivode.

Basarab sent envoys who asked for the hostilities to cease, and in return offered to pay 7,000 marks in silver, submit the fortress of Severin to Charles, and send his own son as hostage. According to the Viennese Illuminated Chronicle, a contemporary account, Charles said about Basarab: "He is the shepherd of my sheep, and I will take him out of his mountains, dragging him by his beard." Another account writes that Charles said that: "...he will drag the Voivode from his cottage, as would any driver his oxen or shepherd his sheep."

The King's councillors begged him to accept the offer or give a milder reply, but he refused and led his 30,000-strong army deeper into Wallachia "without proper supplies or adequate reconnaissance".

Charles entered Curtea de Argeș, the main city of the Wallachian state. Basarab having fled into the mountains, Charles decided to give chase. After many days of difficult marching in the Carpathian Mountains, the king and Basarab agreed to an armistice, with the condition that the latter would provide guides who knew the way out of the mountains and would lead the army back to the Hungarian plain by the shortest route. 

When the army entered a ravine, the Wallachians started to attack them from all sides, shooting arrows and pelting them with trees and stones. The army of Charles Robert was however decisively defeated following heavy hand to hand combat during the last two days of the battle.

Battle 

The location of the battle is still debated among historians. However, Romanian historian Neagu Djuvara denies this and states that the location of the battle was somewhere at the border between Oltenia and Severin.

The Hungarian royal army was made up of ecclesiastics and laymen with military duties. They were joined by Székelys and the Transylvanian Saxons (except the Saxons of Sibiu, who supported Basarab and refused to join Charles' army), as well as numerous units of mercenaries and "countless numbers of Cumans". Stephen Lackfi was named the commander of the army.

The Wallachian army, led by Basarab himself, probably numbered less than 10,000 men and consisted of cavalry, infantry archers, and some locally recruited peasants. When Charles saw his best knights being killed, without being able to fight back, while the escape routes were blocked by the Wallachian cavalry, he gave his royal robes and insignia to one Desev, son of Dionysius  – "who dies under a hail of arrows and stones" – and, with a few loyal subjects, made a difficult escape to Visegrád "clad in dirty civilian clothes".

Charles later recounted in detail, in a charter of 13 December 1335, how one "Nicholas, son of Radoslav", saved his life by defending him from the swords of five Wallachian warriors, giving him enough time to escape.

Aftermath

The victory represented the survival of the Wallachian state, as well as the beginning of a period of tense relations between Basarab and the Kingdom of Hungary, which lasted until 1344, when Basarab sent his son Alexandru in order to re-establish a relationship between the two states.

Because of its large financial power, the Kingdom of Hungary quickly rebuilt its army and found itself in conflict with the Holy Roman Empire in 1337. However, the Hungarian king maintained a de jure suzerainty over Wallachia until the diplomatic disputes had been resolved.

See also
Battle of Velbazhd
Battle of Bannockburn
Battle of Sempach

Footnotes

References
Długosz, Jan & Michael, Maurice. The Annals of Jan Długosz. (Abridged edition). IM Publications, 1997. 
Ghyka, Matila. A Documented Chronology of Roumanian History – from prehistoric times to the present day. Oxford 1941.
Djuvara, Neagu. Thocomerius – Negru Vodă. Un voivod de origine cumană la inceputurile Țării Românești. Bucharest: Humanitas, 2007. .

1330 in Europe
Posada
Posada 1330
Posada 1330
Posada
14th century in Romania